Dayashankar Tiwari is an Indian politician who is served as 54th Mayor of Nagpur.

Career 
He is post graduate and has done Master of Arts. He was the nominee of Bharatiya Janata Party for Mayor for Nagpur Municipal Corporation. He got 107 votes from 151 members. He is the successor of Sandeep Joshi after his resignation.

References 

Marathi politicians
Living people
Bharatiya Janata Party politicians from Maharashtra
Mayors of Nagpur
Year of birth missing (living people)